Erling Nilsen (December 30, 1910 – April 23, 1984) was a Norwegian boxer who competed in the 1936 Summer Olympics.

Amateur career
In 1936 he won the bronze medal in the heavyweight class after winning the third place fight against Ferenc Nagy.  Nilsen also won 7 National Titles in Norway and had 15 victories on the National Team.

Olympic Results
Nilsen represented Norway in the 1936 Olympics, Berlin. Won the Bronze Medal.
W Dq Walter Marti, Switzerland
W KO 2 Ernest Toussaint, Luxembourg
L 3 Guillermo Lovell, Argentina
W WO Ferenc Nagy, Hungary

Other Highlights
Nilsen won the Bronze Medal in the European Championships, Milan, Italy 1937:
W 3 Pilat, Poland
L 3 Olle Tandberg, Sweden

He was a member of the first official boxing contest between England and Norway on December 8, 1935 in the Oslo Colosseum; his opponent was H. P. Floyd. He represented the club BK Pugilist.

References

 profile

1910 births
1984 deaths
Heavyweight boxers
Olympic boxers of Norway
Boxers at the 1936 Summer Olympics
Olympic bronze medalists for Norway
Olympic medalists in boxing
Norwegian male boxers
Medalists at the 1936 Summer Olympics
20th-century Norwegian people